Mostly Autumn are an English rock band. The group formed in 1995 and have built their reputation through constant touring, never signing to a major label. They produce music heavily influenced by 1970s progressive rock. According to the BBC, Mostly Autumn "fuse the music of Genesis and Pink Floyd with Celtic themes, hard rock and strong, emotional melodies". They have also been compared with other progressive bands from the same era such as Renaissance, Jethro Tull and Camel, blended with traditional folk music. Later albums also include more contemporary influences.

History
Mostly Autumn was formed in the mid 1990s.  The original line-up included several members of One Stoned Snowman, a Pink Floyd/1970s tribute band. The band's founding line-up consisted of band leader Bryan Josh (vocals and guitars), Heidi Widdop (vocals), Iain Jennings (keyboards), Liam Davison (guitars), Alun Hughes (bass and occasional keyboards), Bob Faulds (violin), Kev Gibbons (whistles), and Chris Walton (drums). Mostly Autumn's first live shows were supported by One Stoned Snowman or vice versa; One Stoned Snowman's final concert was a farewell show in December 1995 and was indeed supported by Mostly Autumn. Mostly Autumn's original rhythm section of Alun Hughes and Chris Walton left the band during 1996 to concentrate on other musical projects and family commitments respectively.  They were replaced by bassist Stuart Carver and drummer Allan Scott.  Shortly after, Widdop was replaced on vocals by Heather Findlay.

This line-up recorded For All We Shared... in 1998. More line-up changes ensued.  By 1999, when the band recorded its second album, The Spirit of Autumn Past, Gibbons and Scott had been replaced by Angela Goldthorpe and Rob McNeil respectively.

In 2000 (as a three piece – Bryan, Heather, and Angela) they achieved a support slot for Blackmore's Night on their Under a Violet Moon tour, bringing them to a wider audience.  On the cover artwork for the following Blackmore's Night album Fires at Midnight (2001), Heather Findlay provided the illustration for the song "Hanging Tree".

On Mostly Autumn's third album, The Last Bright Light (2001), Rob McNeil, in turn, was replaced by Jonathan Blackmore (not related to Ritchie). Andy Smith replaced Stuart Carver on the bass guitar. Shortly before the band's 'V Shows' tour in 2004, Iain's brother Andrew Jennings took over on drums and percussion. By this time, the band had been praised by Rick Wright of Pink Floyd. Olivia Sparnenn joined the band in 2005 to provide additional backing vocals. Ben Matthews of Thunder stood in on keyboards for Mostly Autumn's headline gig at the Baja Prog Festival in Mexico in March 2006. Chris Johnson was then recruited as a permanent replacement, with Angela (now under her married name Gordon) also taking a more prominent role on keyboards.

At the beginning of 2007, both guitarist Liam Davison and drummer Andrew Jennings left the band; Davison to concentrate on his solo album and Jennings to devote his time to his other projects. The guitar parts were shared out amongst the rest of the group. Ex-Karnataka drummer Gavin Griffiths stood in on drums for most of the 2007 live shows; Andrew Jennings temporarily rejoined the group at the end of 2007, until Henry Bourne took over in 2008. Gavin Griffiths returned for the first shows of 2009 in Manchester and London. After Chris Johnson and Angela Gordon left in 2007, Iain Jennings and Liam Davison returned to the group on keyboards and guitar respectively. Anne-Marie Helder (who had played support slots in the past and stood in for Angela during her pregnancy) took over the role of flute, keyboards and backing vocals. A new studio album entitled Glass Shadows was released in early 2008 and an accompanying tour took place in spring and early summer. A 100-minute DVD, 'The Making of Glass Shadows', accompanied the special pre-order version of the album.

During October 2008, Mostly Autumn performed two gigs with an alternative, semi-acoustic line-up in support of the Bad Shepherds. The line-up consisted of Bryan Josh (guitar and vocals), Olivia Sparnenn (lead vocals), Andy Smith (bass), Anne-Marie Helder (keyboards and flute) and Robbie Baxter (drums). This tour was truncated after the Bad Shepherds cancelled many dates.

Mostly Autumn have their own independent record label and choose to finance each album release itself. The group typically prints a limited edition of each album and sells those to cover their recording costs. A retail version of the album is then made available via retail outlets, distributors, the group's concerts and through their website.

Up to and including Heart Full of Sky (2006), Mostly Autumn's albums have started with the last few seconds of the previous album's final song. This tradition was dropped with the release of Glass Shadows (2008).

At the beginning of 2010, Heather Findlay announced her intention to leave the band to focus on solo work and on her family.  She performed her last gig with the band at Leamington Spa Assembly on 2 April 2010. This was filmed, and released as a 2-disc DVD under the name That Night in Leamington, which also included a 30-minute interview with Josh and Findlay. After her departure, Olivia Sparnenn stepped into the lead role, and the band's next album Go Well Diamond Heart was released in 2010.

Bryan Josh and Olivia Sparnenn were married on 21 June 2013.

From mid-2013 onwards, Helder and Griffiths were absent from the band's touring line-up due to other commitments; their positions being temporarily filled by keyboardist Hannah Hird and drummer Alex Cromarty. In March 2014, it was revealed by Bryan Josh on the band's official website that Griffiths had decided to leave the band and that Cromarty was now his official replacement. With this line-up the band then recorded their eleventh album, Dressed in Voices. In May 2014, shortly prior to the release of Dressed in Voices, Josh announced that founding member Liam Davison had left the band and had been replaced by returning member Chris Johnson, and this new line-up recorded the live album Box of Tears.

In the autumn of 2014, Josh and Sparnenn – as "Mostly Autumn Acoustic" – supported Steve Hackett on the UK leg of his "Genesis Extended" tour.

In mid-2015, former Mostly Autumn flautist and keyboardist Angela Gordon replaced Hannah Hird in the band's touring line-up; whilst no official statement was made at the time, the band have now acknowledged that Gordon had officially replaced Helder in the band's line-up, and with this new line-up the band recorded its next album, Sight of Day.

On 5 November 2017, the band announced that founding guitarist Liam Davison had died.

Side-projects
Founding members Bryan Josh, Liam Davison, Heidi Widdop, Alun Hughes, Bob Faulds and Chris Walton played in the Pink Floyd/1970s tribute band One Stoned Snowman. They disbanded at the end of 1995, largely due to the popularity of Mostly Autumn.

Liam Davison and Alun Hughes played with the hard rock band Life Support from their founding in 1994 until leaving at the same time during 1996. Life Support split up in 1999.

Heather Findlay contributed to Arjen Lucassen's 'Ayreon' project on The Human Equation album in 2004, singing the part of "Love".

Iain Jennings left the band at the beginning of 2006 to pursue his own musical ambitions and formed his own band, Breathing Space, as well as contributing to projects by other artists and even becoming a Music Technology teacher at Huntington School, York, a local Comprehensive. He recruited then-Mostly Autumn backing vocalist Olivia Sparnenn to sing lead vocals and the pair, along with various other musicians recorded three albums. Despite his return to the Mostly Autumn fold in 2008, Iain remained a member and core songwriter in Breathing Space. In April 2010, Sparnenn took over lead vocals in Mostly Autumn so decided to stop working with Breathing Space. Breathing Space continued for a short while with original Mostly Autumn vocalist Heidi Widdop, before splitting up.

During 2005 Heather Findlay and Angela Gordon formed an acoustic side project called Odin Dragonfly, making live appearances both as a support act and as headliners. In August 2007 they released their first album, Offerings.

Both Anne-Marie Helder and Gavin Griffiths are members of Panic Room, and were previously members of Karnataka.

Following a one off project in 2019 involving Iain Jennings and York rock band Godson (which includes founding Mostly Autumn bassist Alun Hughes), Iain became a full member of Godson in August 2020. They subsequently changed their name to The Tower Radio and are working on their eponymous first album. This has been delayed by Covid-19 restrictions and is now planned for release in 2022.

Personnel

Members

Current members
 Bryan Josh – vocals, guitars, keyboards (1995–present)
 Iain Jennings – keyboards, backing vocals (1995–2006, 2007–present)
 Angela Gordon – flutes, keyboards, recorders, whistles, percussion, backing vocals (1999–2007, 2015–present)
 Andy Smith – bass (2000–present)
 Olivia Sparnenn – vocals, percussion, keyboards (2004–present)
 Chris Johnson – rhythm & acoustic guitars, keyboards, vocals (2006–2007, 2014–present)
 Henry Rogers – drums (2018–present)

Former members
 Alex Cromarty – drums (2014–2018; touring – 2013–2014)
 Liam Davison – rhythm & acoustic guitars, vocals (1995–2007, 2007–2014; died 2017)
 Bob Faulds – violins (1995–2000)
 Kev Gibbons – whistles (1995–1999)
 Heidi Widdop – vocals (1995–1996)
 Alun Hughes – bass, keyboards (1995–1996)
 Chris Walton – drums (1995–1996)
 Stuart Carver – bass (1996–2000)
 Allan Scott – drums (1996–1999)
 Heather Findlay – vocals, acoustic guitars, keyboards, recorders, whistles, percussion (1996–2010)
 Rob McNeil – drums (1999–2000)
 Jonathan Blackmore – drums (2000–2004)
 Andrew Jennings – drums (2004–2007, 2007)
 Anne-Marie Helder – flutes, keyboards, acoustic guitars, recorders, whistles, percussion, backing vocals (2007–2015)
 Henry Bourne – drums (2007–2008)
 Robbie Baxter – drums (2008–2009)
 Gavin Griffiths – drums (2009–2014; touring – 2007)

Former touring personnel
 Hannah Hird – keyboards, percussion, backing vocals (2013–2015, substitute for Helder)

Timeline

Discography

Studio albums
 For All We Shared... (1998)
 The Spirit of Autumn Past (1999)
 The Last Bright Light (2001)
 Music Inspired by The Lord of the Rings (2001)
 Passengers (2003)
 Storms Over Still Water (2005)
 Heart Full of Sky (2006)
 Glass Shadows (2008)
 Go Well Diamond Heart (2010)
 The Ghost Moon Orchestra (2012)
 Dressed in Voices (2014)
 Sight of Day (2017)
 White Rainbow (2019)
 Graveyard Star (2021)

Live albums
 The Story So Far... (CD and VHS 2001)
 Live in the USA (CD 2003)
 The Fiddler's Shindig (CD 2003, DVD 2005)
 Live at the Canterbury Fayre (CD 2003)
 Live at the Grand Opera House (CD & DVD 2003)
 The Next Chapter (DVD 2003)
 The V Shows (DVD 2004, CD 2005)
 Pink Floyd Revisited (DVD 2004)
 Storms over London Town (CD 2006)
 Live 2009 (CD 2009)
 That Night in Leamington (CD & DVD 2010)
 Live at High Voltage (CD 2011)
 Still Beautiful Live 2011 (CD 2011)
 Live at the Boerderij  (CD & DVD 2012)
 Box of Tears (CD 2015)
 Acoustic in support of the Genesis revisited tour 2014 (CD 2015)
 Back In These Arms. Recorded at De Boerderij, NL - 4th June 2022 (2CD 2022)

Anthologies
 Heroes Never Die – The Anthology (2002, deleted)
 Catch the Spirit – The Complete Anthology (2002)
 Pass the Clock (2009)

EPs and singles
 Goodbye Alone (2001)
 Prints in the Stone (2001)
 Spirits of Christmas Past (2005)
 A Different Sky (2008)

References

External links
Official website
Olivia Sparnenn Josh - Official website

English folk rock groups
English hard rock musical groups
English progressive rock groups
Musical groups established in 1996
1996 establishments in England